Murphy High School (MHS) is a public high school in Murphy, North Carolina, it serves grades 9–12 and is one of only three high schools in the Cherokee County Schools. As of 2007 it had a full-time teaching staff of 42 teachers giving an average of 12 students per teacher. It has a GreatSchools rating of 5/10 and an average community rating of 4/5 stars. In 2019-20 average daily membership was 451. By 2025, as a result of a May 2020 vote by the Cherokee County Board of Education, students from the county's three high schools will attend one high school.

Athletics
Baseball
Basketball
Cheerleading
Cross Country
Football
Golf
Track
Soccer
Softball
Swimming
Volleyball
Wrestling

Notable alumni
Carl Pickens, former NFL wide receiver and 2x Pro Bowl selection (1995, 1996)
Hedy West, folksinger and songwriter

See also
Murphy Elementary School
Murphy Middle School

References

External links 
List of high schools in North Carolina

Public high schools in North Carolina
Schools in Cherokee County, North Carolina